Heine Fernandez (born Heine Lavrsen; 14 July 1966) is a Danish former professional footballer who played as a forward. He spent the bulk of his career for Viborg FF and Silkeborg IF.

Club career
Fernandez was the top goalscorer of the 1999 Danish football championship.  Fernandez also represented Danish clubs F.C. Copenhagen and Akademisk Boldklub.

International career
Fernandez made his debut for Denmark national team in a September 1991 friendly match against Iceland, coming on as a substitute for Per Frandsen. It turned out to be his only international match.

Footnotes

External links
 

Living people
1966 births
Danish men's footballers
Association football forwards
Denmark international footballers
Danish Superliga players
Viborg FF players
Silkeborg IF players
F.C. Copenhagen players
Akademisk Boldklub players
Havnar Bóltfelag players
Danish people of Spanish descent